Rugby sevens at the 2002 Commonwealth Games was the second Commonwealth Games where rugby sevens was played.
The gold medal was won by New Zealand who defeated Fiji in the final.

Pool stage

Pool A

Pool B

Pool C

Pool D

Knockout stages

Cup

Plate
For teams knocked out of the Cup quarter finals

Bowl

Medallists

References

External links

rugby sevens
2002
2002 rugby sevens competitions
International rugby union competitions hosted by England